James Napier may refer to:

James Napier (chemist) (1810–1884), Scottish chemist and antiquarian
James Robert Napier (1821–1879), Scottish engineer, inventor of Napier's diagram
James Carroll Napier (1845–1940), American businessman, civil rights leader, and Register of the Treasury
Jim Napier (born 1938), baseball catcher and manager
Jimmy Napes (James Napier), British songwriter, producer and musician
James Napier Robertson (born 1982), New Zealand writer, actor, film director and producer, sometimes credited as James Napier